The Ali–Frazier Award (known as the Harry Markson Award prior to 2009) is given annually to the fighters who compete in the Boxing Writers Association of America's Fight of the Year.  The award has been conferred annually since the BWAA's awards dinner in 2003.  The BWAA votes on the best fight of each year regardless of the weight class or nationality of the fighters.

The award was originally named for Harry Markson, a boxing promoter and publicist who served for five years as the president of boxing operations at Madison Square Garden. In 2009, the award was renamed the Ali–Frazier Award in honor of Muhammad Ali and Joe Frazier, and their epic fight trilogy. The award is presented with other honors given by the BWAA at an annual awards dinner.

List of winners

See also
The Ring magazine Fight of the Year
BWAA Fighter of the Year

References

External links
List of award winners. Boxing Writers Association of America official website

Boxing awards
Awards established in 2002
2002 establishments in the United States